The Namibian Ministry of Mines and Energy (MME) was established at Namibian independence in 1990. The first Namibian minister of mines and energy was Andimba Toivo ya Toivo, a liberation fighter posthumously declared a national hero of Namibia. The  mines and energy minister is Tom Alweendo.

Ministers
All mines and energy ministers in chronological order are:

See also
Mining in Namibia
Economy of Namibia

References

External links
Official website Ministry of Mines and Energy

Mines and Energy
Mines and Energy
Mining in Namibia
Economy of Namibia
1990 establishments in Namibia